The Nelson Mandela Mural is a 10-storey,  public artwork on Juta Street in Braamfontein, Johannesburg, created by Shepard Fairey and completed in September 2014. It pays tribute to Nelson Mandela and the 25th anniversary of the Purple Rain Protest. The mural overlooks the Nelson Mandela Bridge, and is seen by many as a sequel to Fairey's iconic Barack Obama HOPE poster.

"It is a huge exclamation point in the heart of Johannesburg..." said Patrick Gaspard, American Ambassador to South Africa, "...It forces us to stop, and remember the long struggle for freedom in this country, and the miraculous achievements of Nelson Mandela."

The project was curated and produced by Jesse Stagg with the support of the Nelson Mandela Foundation, the U.S. State department, Play Braamfontein, and the South African Consulate of Los Angeles.

External links
SouthAfrica.net: Joburg streets a canvas reflecting our culture and history
Respect Mag: Shepard Fairey paints huge Nelson Mandela portrait in South Africa
Street Art News: Fairey creates giant Mandela portrait
Sunday Times: The day the purple governed
Slate.com: Purple water cannons
The New Yorker: The purple shall govern

References

Murals
Mural
Public art in Johannesburg
Graffiti and unauthorised signage